Padden is a surname, and may refer to:

Bert Padden (c. 1932-2010), Scottish football referee
Billy Joe Padden, Gaelic footballer, son of Willie Joe Padden   
Carol Padden (born 1955), American professor
Daniel Padden, English musician, member of Volcano the Bear
Dave Padden (born 1976), Canadian musician
Dick Padden (1870–1922), American professional baseball player
Mike Padden (born 1946), American district court judge
Sarah Padden (1881–1967), American theatre and film actress
Tessa Padden, British television presenter
Tom Padden (1908–1973), American baseball player
Willie Joe Padden (born 1959), Gaelic footballer

See also
Lake Padden, lake in the United States

Surnames
English-language surnames